Crunch may refer to:

 Big Crunch, a hypothetical scenario for the ultimate fate of the universe
 Credit crunch, a sudden reduction in the general availability of loans or a sudden tightening of the requirement conditions
 Crunch (chocolate bar), a chocolate bar made of milk chocolate and crisped rice
 Crunch Fitness, a chain of over 300 franchised fitness clubs located in the United States, Canada and Australia
 Crunch (video games), a period in which video game developers take on significant, often uncompensated overtime
 Crunchiness, the sensation of muffled grinding of a foodstuff
 John Draper (born 1943; also "Crunch"), an American computer programmer and legendary former phone phreak

Athletics
 Le Crunch, the traditional name for the England–France rugby match at the Six Nations Championship
 Crunch (exercise), one of the most popular abdominal exercises
 Syracuse Crunch, a professional ice hockey team in the American Hockey League

Media
 Crunch, a term used in the context of role-playing games
 Crunch (book), a book written by Jared Bernstein
 The Crunch (comics), an A4 British comic
 Crunch (TV programming block), a former Saturday morning programming block dedicated to animation on the Canadian television channel YTV
 Crunch Bandicoot, a character from the Crash Bandicoot franchise of video games

Music
 "The Crunch", a 1977 single by English producer, arranger, conductor and multi-instrumentalist Richard Anthony Hewson
 The Crunch, a 1984 EP by British post-punk/alternative rock band The Nightingales
 Crunch, a 2000 album by American heavy metal band Impellitteri
 The Crunch (band), an English/Swedish power pop group
 Crunch (Cry Wolf album), the second album released by the glam rock band Cry Wolf